Daniel Nestor and Nenad Zimonjić were the defending champions after defeating Ross Hutchins and Jordan Kerr in the 2010 final. However, they chose to not defend the title as a team as the split at the end of the 2010 season. Nestor tried to defend his title with new partner Max Mirnyi, but they lost to Julien Benneteau and Richard Gasquet in the first round.
Unseeded Lukáš Dlouhý and Paul Hanley won this tournament. Their triumph in the final was surprising, because they defeated 1st seeds Bob and Mike Bryan 6–7(6), 6–3, [10–5].

Seeds

Draw

Draw

References

External Links
 Main Draw

M